Igarapé-Açu is a municipality in the state of Pará in the Northern region of Brazil. The population of the municipality is approximately 39,023 inhabitants according to IBGE estimate in 2020

See also
List of municipalities in Pará

References

Municipalities in Pará